Rhodopina sakishimana is a species of beetle in the family Cerambycidae. It was described by Yokoyama in 1966. It is known from Japan.

References

sakishimana
Beetles described in 1966